José María Martínez Ochoa de Zabalegui (born March 11, 1968 in Huesca) is a Spanish slalom canoer who competed from the late 1980s to the early 1990s. He finished 35th in the K-1 event at the 1992 Summer Olympics in Barcelona.

References
Sports-Reference.com profile

1968 births
Canoeists at the 1992 Summer Olympics
Living people
Olympic canoeists of Spain
Spanish male canoeists
20th-century Spanish people